Daphne pontica, commonly known as twin-flowered or Pontic daphne, is a species of flowering plant in the family Thymelaeaceae, native to Bulgaria, northern Turkey and the Caucasus. The flowers are often followed by black berries. It tolerates deep shade in the garden, but dislikes transplanting.

This plant has gained the Royal Horticultural Society's Award of Garden Merit.

The specific epithet pontica, refers to the Latin term for Pontus, a city of the Black Sea.

References

pontica
Flora of Bulgaria
Flora of Turkey
Plants described in 1753
Taxa named by Carl Linnaeus